Abel Chimukoko (born September 29, 1972 in Mutoko, Mashonaland East) is a Zimbabwean long-distance runner. He competed for his native country at the 2004 Summer Olympics in Athens, Greece, where he finished in 48th place (2:22:09) in the men's marathon race. His personal best time is 2:15:29 hours, achieved in 2003.

Achievements

2005
Carrela de Aqua 10 km.Madrid. [28:19]
3rd

External links 
 
 
 

1972 births
Living people
People from Mutoko
Zimbabwean male long-distance runners
Athletes (track and field) at the 2004 Summer Olympics
Olympic athletes of Zimbabwe
Athletes (track and field) at the 1998 Commonwealth Games
Commonwealth Games competitors for Zimbabwe
Sportspeople from Mashonaland East Province
Athletes (track and field) at the 2003 All-Africa Games
African Games competitors for Zimbabwe